Volcan or  Volcán may refer to:

Places
Volcán, Panama, town in Panama
Volcán (Jujuy), town in Argentina

Other uses
Volcan (mining company), Peruvian mining company
Volcán River, Chile
Volcán Lake, Bolivia

People with the surname
Erin Volcán (born 1984), Venezuelan swimmer
Mickey Volcan (born 1962), Canadian ice hockey player
Mike Volcan (1932–2013), Canadian football player
Ramón Volcán, Venezuelan swimmer

See also
Vulcan (disambiguation)
Vulkan (disambiguation)
Volcano (disambiguation)
Volcanic (disambiguation)